Sriramachandra is a 1992 Indian Kannada-language film directed by D. Rajendra Babu and produced by P. Dhanraj. The film stars Ravichandran in dual roles, along with Mohini, Vajramuni and Srinath amongst others. The music and lyrics were composed by Hamsalekha. The film is a remake of the Tamil film Kalyanaraman (1979), written by Panchu Arunachalam.

Synopsis
Srirama and Chandra are twins born to Srinath and Sumithra. Over a family difference, the couple splits and Srirama lives with his father in the Kalasa (Chikmagalur district) tea estate, while Chandra is raised by his mother in Bangalore city. Srirama is born as an innocent and immature boy whose life revolves around his father and friend Seetha, whom he intends to marry. However, with an urge over property, Srinath's manager Vajramuni hatches a successful plan to murder him and leaves Srirama orphaned and the sole property owner. Srirama, without a knowledge in accounts, gets cheated regularly by his manager. Before dying, Srirama's father reveals the secret about his mother and twin brother staying in Bangalore. Knowing this, manager tricks a drama couple as his mother and brother and makes him believe it. However, Srirama learns about the gang's plan and runs away to inform the police. En route, he gets killed by falling off a cliff, making Seetha lose her consciousness and become mentally unstable. The rest of the plot tells about how Srirama becomes a ghost and informs all the incidents to his twin brother in the city and how Chandra deals with the situation.

Cast
Ravichandran as Srirama and Chandra
Mohini as Geetha
Srinath 
Vajramuni as Estate manager 
Dheerendra Gopal as Bhatta 
Mukhyamantri Chandru
Umashree
Sumithra as Rajalakshmi 
Rajanand as Estate Jeep driver
Shivaram
Krishne Gowda as Estate Lawyer 
Mafia Shashi as lingappa 
Bank Suresh 
Tiger Juneja 
Stunt Devu

Songs
Hamsalekha composed and written all songs of the movie which became hits.

Reception
The film and music composed by Hamsalekha was well received and the audio sales hit a record high.

References

External links
 Songs list

1992 films
1990s Kannada-language films
Films scored by Hamsalekha
Kannada remakes of Tamil films
Twins in Indian films
Indian ghost films
Indian comedy horror films
1990s comedy horror films
Films directed by D. Rajendra Babu
1992 comedy films